Cleo Desmond (born Minnie Matilda Hatfield, April 25, 1880 – October 6, 1958) was an American actress and vaudeville performer who had a long career on the stage and screen.

She began acting and performing at a young age, appearing in plays and in vaudeville acts as early as 1903 under the stage name Cleo Desmond. She gained nationwide attention as a member of the Lafayette Players. She and Andrew S. Bishop drew adoring fans to their theatrical performances.

She eventually won some film roles and was cast in several of Oscar Micheaux's films.

Selected filmography 

 Mokey (1942)
 Mr. Washington Goes to Town (1941)
 Am I Guilty? (1940)
 Spirit of Youth (1938)
 The Millionaire (1927)
 Deceit (1923)
 The Easiest Way (1917)

References 

American film actresses
American stage actresses
Vaudeville performers
1880 births
1958 deaths
Actresses from Philadelphia